Bujar Lika (born 11 August 1992) is an Albanian footballer who plays as a midfielder or as a right-back for FC Schaffhausen in the Swiss Challenge League.

International career
Lika made his international debut for the Albania national football team in a friendly 1-0 loss to Norway on 26 March 2018.

References

External links
 

1992 births
Living people
People from Ferizaj
Kosovo Albanians
Association football midfielders
Association football fullbacks
Kosovan footballers
Albanian footballers
Albania international footballers
FC Wohlen players
FC Schaffhausen players
Grasshopper Club Zürich players
Swiss Super League players
Swiss Challenge League players
Albanian expatriate footballers
Kosovan expatriate footballers
Albanian expatriate sportspeople in Switzerland
Kosovan expatriate sportspeople in Switzerland
Expatriate footballers in Switzerland